Vardan Grigorievich Pogosyan (born 8 March 1992) is an Armenian-Russian former footballer who played as a forward.

Career
Pogosyan made two appearances for the Armenia national under-21 team, appearing twice against Iran Olympic team on 4 and 6 August 2014. He made his senior debut for Armenia on 8 October 2015 in a friendly match against France, which finished as a 0–4 loss.

Career statistics

International

References

External links
 
 
 
 
 

1992 births
Living people
Footballers from Yerevan
Armenian footballers
Armenia under-21 international footballers
Armenia international footballers
Armenian expatriate footballers
Expatriate footballers in Spain
Armenian expatriate sportspeople in Moldova
Expatriate footballers in Moldova
Expatriate footballers in North Macedonia
Russian footballers
Association football forwards
UD Horadada players
Real Murcia Imperial players
UD San Sebastián de los Reyes players
FC Kuban Krasnodar players
FC Pyunik players
FC Dacia Chișinău players
FK Rabotnički players
FC Gandzasar Kapan players
FC Urartu players
FC Alashkert players
Armenian Premier League players
Macedonian First Football League players